Manuele Boaro (born 12 March 1987) is an Italian professional road bicycle racer, who currently rides for UCI WorldTeam .

Boaro joined professional team  in the second half of 2010 as a stagiaire. After completing his stagiaire stint, Boaro joined  for the 2011 season, on a one-year contract. His contract was extended by two more years in late 2011. He was named in the startlist for the 2016 Vuelta a España. After the  team disbanded, Boaro joined . In August 2018 it was announced that Boaro would join  from 2019 on a two-year contract, with a role as a domestique.

Major results

2004
 3rd Time trial, National Junior Road Championships
2005
 1st  Time trial, National Junior Road Championships
 1st Stage 3b Tre Ciclistica Bresciana Junior
 2nd GP dell'Arno Junior
 3rd  Time trial, UEC European Junior Road Championships
2007
 1st Gran Premio della Liberazione
 1st Stage 1 Grand Prix Guillaume Tell
 1st Stage 3 Under-23 Giro di Toscana
 1st Stage 1 (TTT) Giro del Veneto
 3rd Time trial, National Under-23 Road Championships
 3rd Citadella
2008
 1st Trofeo Zsšdi
 2nd Time trial, National Under-23 Road Championships
 7th Overall Tour de San Luis
 8th Under-23 Giro del Canavese
2009
 1st Memorial Davide Fardelli
 2nd Trofeo Alcide Degasperi
2010
 1st Trofeo Città di Brescia
 2nd Coppa della Pace
 2nd Cronoscalata Gardone
 4th Freccia dei Vini
 7th Trofeo Edil C
2011
 2nd Time trial, National Road Championships
2012
 2nd Overall Circuit de la Sarthe
 3rd Overall Danmark Rundt
 7th Chrono des Nations
2013
 1st  Mountains classification Volta ao Algarve
 5th Time trial, National Road Championships
2014
 3rd Overall Danmark Rundt
1st Stage 3
 5th Time trial, National Road Championships
2015
 2nd Overall Circuit Cycliste Sarthe
1st Stage 3
 8th Gran Premio di Lugano
 9th Overall Dubai Tour
 10th Overall Critérium International
2016
 2nd Time trial, National Road Championships
 10th Overall Danmark Rundt
2018
 1st Stage 5 Tour of Croatia
2019
 1st Stage 1 (TTT) Vuelta a España
 3rd  Team relay, UEC European Road Championships

Grand Tour general classification results timeline

References

External links

Team Saxo Bank profile

Cycling Quotient profile

Italian male cyclists
1987 births
Living people
People from Bassano del Grappa
Cyclists from the Province of Vicenza
European Games competitors for Italy
Cyclists at the 2015 European Games